The Roman Catholic Diocese of Otukpo is a diocese located in the city of Otukpo in the Ecclesiastical province of Abuja in Nigeria.

History
 July 10, 1995: Established as Diocese of Otukpo from the Diocese of Makurdi. The first bishop of the diocese is Late Most Revd. Fidelis Oga Orgah.

Special churches
The Cathedral is St Francis’ Cathedral in Otukpo.

Leadership
 Bishops of Otupko (Roman rite)
 Bishop Fidelis oga Orgah (July 10, 1995 – December 7, 2000)
 Bishop Michael Ekwoyi Apochi (since December 17, 2002)

See also
Roman Catholicism in Nigeria

Sources
 GCatholic.org Information
 Catholic Hierarchy

Roman Catholic dioceses in Nigeria
Christian organizations established in 1995
Roman Catholic dioceses and prelatures established in the 20th century
Roman Catholic Ecclesiastical Province of Abuja